Hermanus Lambertus Potgieter  (born 11 January 1953 in Kirkwood, Eastern Cape, South Africa) is a former South African rugby union player.

Playing career
Potgieter attended the University of Stellenbosch for two years in 1973 and 1974, after which he relocated to the University of the Free State. He went on the play his senior provincial rugby for the Free State and Eastern Province. Potgieter made his test match debut for the Springboks against the World XV on 27 August 1977 at Loftus Versfeld in Pretoria and scored a try on his test debut.

Test history

Accolades
Potgieter was one of the five Young Players of the Year in 1975, along with Tommy du Plessis, Christo Wagenaar, De Wet Ras and Corrie Pypers. In 1977 he was one of the five players nominated for SA Rugby Player of the Year, when Moaner van Heerden received the award.

See also
List of South Africa national rugby union players – Springbok no. 493

References

1953 births
Living people
South African rugby union players
South Africa international rugby union players
Free State Cheetahs players
People from Sunday's River Valley Local Municipality
Rugby union players from the Eastern Cape
Rugby union wings